And Starring Pancho Villa as Himself is a 2003 American made-for-television western film for HBO in partnership with City Entertainment and starring Antonio Banderas as Pancho Villa, directed by Bruce Beresford, written by Larry Gelbart and produced by Joshua D. Maurer, Mark Gordon, and Larry Gelbart. The cast also includes Alan Arkin, Jim Broadbent, Michael McKean, Eion Bailey, and Alexa Davalos.

Maurer, who originally conceived the story and did extensive research, sold the project to HBO and then brought on Gordon and hired Gelbart to write and collaborate on the screenplay. At the time of production, this was the most expensive 2-hour television/cable movie ever made, with a budget of over $30 million. The movie was shot almost entirely on location in and around San Miguel de Allende, Mexico.

Plot
The film opens in 1923 with studio executive Frank N. Thayer (Eion Bailey) receiving a letter in the mail, alongside a medallion of the Virgin Mary.

The film then shifts to the height of the Mexican Revolution. Pancho Villa (Antonio Banderas) finds himself without adequate funding to finance his war against the military-run government. He also finds himself at odds with the Americans because of the Hearst media empire's press campaign against him. To counter both of these threats, he sends emissaries to movie producers to convince them to pay to film his progress and the actual battles. Producer D.W. Griffith (Colm Feore) is immediately interested and convinces Mutual Film Studios boss Harry E. Aitkin (Jim Broadbent) to send a film crew.  As Aitkin's nephew, Thayer is initially a mere errand boy for the studio, but he makes a good impression with Villa, who demands that Thayer be placed in charge of the project.  Thayer and a camera crew team film Villa leading his men to victory in battle.  Despite the failure of this initial footage (which draws derisive laughter from potential backers) Thayer convinces Aitkin to invest even more money in a second attempt, and also convinces Villa to participate in making a more narrative film.

Thayer returns to Mexico with a director, actors, producers, cameramen and screenwriters, and begin to film Villa's previous exploits using a younger actor, future film director Raoul Walsh (Kyle Chandler).  The filming goes well, although Villa becomes angry that the screenwriters and the director have changed history to make a more dramatic film. However, he agrees to do a cameo appearance as an older version of himself. Meanwhile, Thayer begins a romance with actress Teddy Sampson (Alexa Davalos). He also is assigned two young child soldiers as editing assistants. One night Villa announces that they will attack a Federal held fort at Torreon and win the revolution. The film's director and his crew tell Villa that they are not coming with him to film the battle. Villa scares them into going to the battle by having a firing squad shoot over their heads.

The next morning, Villa assembles his men to attack Torreon.  Thayer and his team go in to film the action.  A skirmish on the way to the fort occurs, with Villa's army repelling the Federales, though one of Thayer's assistants loses his life. Villa's army arrives at Torreon and lays siege to the fortress.  Villa orders an attack and personally leads the charge.  Villa's army is initially successful, but they suffer heavy casualties and are forced to withdraw.  That night, Villa orders his army to bombard Torreon into submission, and, after a long, brutal bombardment, Villa's cavalry finishes off the last of Torreon's Federal defenders.  However, Thayer and his camera crew team witness Villa personally shooting a Mexican widow in cold blood with his handgun during the aftermath of the battle.  Disgusted, the team leaves.

The Life of General Villa is shown in theaters in America, and to great success, although Thayer and his camera crew members regret making the film. Thayer is also dismayed to find out that Teddy, who is attending the premiere, has broken off their romance. Nine years later, Villa is assassinated en route in a town square.

Back in America, Thayer meets with Villa Army veteran Sam Dreben (Alan Arkin) in a restaurant. Having lost an eye and arm during the Revolution, he laments at the current Mexican government being no better than Huerta's. He is equally displeased that Thayer did not gift Villa with a copy of the film as promised. The movie then returns to Thayer in his office, where he reads the letter. It is from his surviving assistant, who has since grown to manhood,  married, and has a child with Villa as a godfather. The letter inspires Thayer to return to Mexico in order to screen the film, where it is met with a passionate audience who cheer at Villa's ending speech.

Thayer then goes on to narrate that Villa has since been reinterred in Mexico City to great fanfare, while the film has since become lost. He also states that he himself has become a footnote in history, though he "does not mind being a footnote to a legend."

Cast
 Antonio Banderas as Pancho Villa 
 Eion Bailey as Frank N. Thayer
 Alan Arkin as Sam Dreben 
 Jim Broadbent as Harry Aitken
 Matt Day as John Reed 
 Kyle Chandler as Raoul Walsh 
 Michael McKean as William Christy Cabanne
 Colm Feore as D. W. Griffith 
 Alexa Davalos as Teddy Sampson
 Anthony Head as William Benton
 Saul Rubinek as Eli Morton
 Damián Alcázar as General Rodolfo Fierro
 Pedro Armendáriz, Jr. as Don Luis Terrazas

Context
The film concerns the filming of The Life of General Villa (which was shot in 1914) and is seen through the eyes of Frank N. Thayer, a studio boss's nephew who gets a career boost when he is placed in charge of the project. The resulting film became the first American feature-length movie, introducing scores of viewers to the true horrors of war that they had never personally seen. Thayer sold the studios on making the film despite their concerns that no one would sit through a movie longer than 1 hour, by convincing them that they could raise the price of movies to ten cents, doubling the going price at that time.  The actual contract that Pancho Villa signed with Frank N. Thayer and the Mutual Film Company on January 5, 1914, to film the Battle of Ojinaga still exists and is in a museum in Mexico City. The original film has been lost, but some unedited film reels of the battle, showing Pancho Villa and his army fighting Federal forces, as well as photographs and publicity stills taken from the original film, still exist.
Raoul Walsh, who played Villa as a young man in The Life of General Villa, wrote extensively about the experience in his autobiography Each Man in His Time, describing Villa's charisma as well as noting that peasants would knock the teeth out of corpses with rocks in the wake of firing squads in order to harvest the gold fillings, which was captured on film and had the projectionists vomiting in the screening room back in Los Angeles.

The original film's producer, D. W. Griffith, directed The Birth of a Nation in 1915, which featured Walsh as John Wilkes Booth. That same year, Walsh directed the first gangster movie, Regeneration, on location in the Lower East Side of New York City, and went on to direct approximately 138 movies, including such films as The Big Trail (1930) with John Wayne (Walsh discovered Wayne as a propman, renamed him, and cast him in the lead in this widescreen epic), Me and My Gal (1932) with Spencer Tracy and Joan Bennett, The Bowery with Wallace Beery and George Raft, The Roaring Twenties with James Cagney and Humphrey Bogart, High Sierra (1941) with Ida Lupino and Bogart, They Died with Their Boots On (1941) with Errol Flynn and Olivia de Havilland, White Heat (1949) with Cagney, and Band of Angels (1957) with Clark Gable and Sidney Poitier.

Accolades

References

External links
 

2003 television films
2003 films
American drama television films
2003 drama films
Films about filmmaking
Films about Pancho Villa
Films set in 1914
Films set in 1923
Films set in Manhattan
Films set in Mexico
Films set in New Jersey
Films set in Texas
Films shot in Mexico
Mexican Revolution films
Films with screenplays by Larry Gelbart
Films directed by Bruce Beresford
Drama films based on actual events
2000s English-language films